The 4 Hours of Imola is an endurance race for sports cars held at Autodromo Enzo e Dino Ferrari in Imola, Italy.

Results

References

External links 
 Racing Sports Cars: Imola archive

 
Recurring sporting events established in 1954
Imola Circuit